The third cabinet of Ion Antonescu was the government of Romania from 27 January 1941 to 23 August 1944. On 22 June 1941, Romania entered World War II on the side of the Axis powers and invaded the Soviet Union.

Ministers
The ministers of the cabinet were as follows:

President of the Council of Ministers:
Gen. Ion Antonescu (27 January 1941 – 23 August 1944)
Vice President of the Council of Ministers:
Mihai A. Antonescu (21 June 1941 – 23 August 1944)
Minister of State Secretary: 
Mihai A. Antonescu (27 January – 21 June 1941)
Minister of State Secretary and Propaganda: 
Nichifor Crainic (27 January – 1 April 1941)
Minister of Foreign Affairs: 
(interim) Gen. Ion Antonescu (27 January – 29 June 1941)
Mihai A. Antonescu (29 June 1941 – 23 August 1944)
Minister of the Interior:
Gen.  (27 January 1941 - 23 August 1944)
Minister of Justice:
 (27 January – 15 February 1941)
 (15 February 1941 – 14 August 1942)
Ion C. Marinescu (14 August 1942 – 23 August 1944)
Minister of National Defence:
Gen.  (27 January – 22 September 1941)
(interim) Marshal Ion Antonescu (22 September 1941 – 22 January 1942)
Gen.  (22 January 1942 – 23 August 1944)
Minister of National Economy:
Gen.  (27 January – 26 May 1941)
Ion C. Marinescu (26 May 1941 – 14 August 1942)
 (14 August 1942 – 19 February 1943)
(interim) Gen.  (19 February 1943 – 23 August 1944)
Minister of Finance:
Gen.  (27 January 1941 – 8 April 1942)
Ion C. Marinescu (8 April 1942 – 25 September 1942)
 (25 September 1942 – 1 April 1944)
 (1 April – 23 August 1944)
Minister of Agriculture and Property
Gen.  (27 January 1941 – 19 March 1942)
 (19 March 1942 – 3 July 1943)
Ion Marian (3 July 1943 – 24 April 1944)
Petre Nemoianu (24 April – 23 August 1944)
Minister of Public Works and Communications:
Gen.  (27 January – 9 July 1941)
 (9 July 1941 – 5 August 1943)
 (6 October 1943 – 23 August 1944)
Minister of War Production:
Gen.  (16 September 1942 – 23 August 1944)
Minister of Labour, Health and Social Security:
 (27 January 1941 – 23 August 1944)
Minister of National Education, Religious Affairs and the Arts:  
Gen. Radu R. Rosetti (27 January – 11 November 1941)
(interim) Mareșal Ion Antonescu (11 November – 5 December 1941)
Ion Petrovici (5 December 1941 – 23 August 1944)
Minister of Propaganda:
Nichifor Crainic (1 April – 26 May 1941)
(interim) Mihai A. Antonescu (26 May 1941 – 23 August 1944)
Minister of Coordination and Economic Status:
Lt. Col.  (27 January – 3 April 1941)

References

Cabinets of Romania
Cabinets established in 1941
Cabinets disestablished in 1944
1941 establishments in Romania
1944 disestablishments in Romania
Romania in World War II